Cumberland is a historic farm property at 9007 Cumberland Road in central northern New Kent County, Virginia. The main house has a construction history dating to the 18th century, and includes a number of interior features from that period. The exterior is largely the product of a 1930s update of the property to a design by Harden de Valsen Pratt, a major restoration architect. Other historic elements of the property include a barn and the family cemetery of the Toler and Fauntleroy families, who owned the property for over a century.

The property was listed on the National Register of Historic Places in 2017.

See also
National Register of Historic Places listings in New Kent County, Virginia

References

Houses completed in 1782
Houses in New Kent County, Virginia
Houses on the National Register of Historic Places in Virginia
National Register of Historic Places in New Kent County, Virginia
1782 establishments in Virginia
Historic districts in Virginia